A musical clock is a clock that marks the hours of the day with a musical tune. They can be considered elaborate versions of striking or chiming clocks.

Elaborate large-scale musical clocks with automatons are often installed in public places and are widespread in Japan. Unlike conventional electronic musical clocks, these clocks plays pre-recorded music samples, instead of using programmed sound synthesis. One of the earliest known domestic musical clocks was constructed by Nicholas Vallin in 1598, and it currently resides in the British Museum in London.

Description
The music on mechanical clocks is typically played from a spiked cylinder on bells, organ pipes, or bellows.  On electric clocks such as quartz clocks, the music is usually generated using an electronic sound module; Seiko and Rhythm Clock are known for their battery-powered musical clocks, which frequently feature flashing lights, automatons and other moving parts designed to attract attention while in motion. Most of these quartz musical clocks utilize either FM synthesis or sample-based synthesis technology for sound generation to produce high-fidelity and complex music, similar to the sound generation methods of electronic musical instruments.

Pipe organ clock
The pipe organ clock was a specific clock that chimed with a small pipe organ built into the unit. An example is a Markwick Markham made for the Turkish market, circa 1770.

Popularity in Japan
In Japan, aside from the extensive popularity of large-scale musical clocks installed in public facilities, electronic musical wall clocks has become a popular novelty items since the late 1990s. They are mostly collected for their aesthetic and decorative values, especially those with elaborate movements and advanced music generation.

See also 

Automaton clock
Music by CPE Bach for musical clock

References

External links 

Clock designs
Mechanical musical instruments